Planera is a genus of flowering plants with a single living species, Planera aquatica, the planertree or water elm. The genus has an extensive fossil record dating back to the Cretaceous and spanning the northern hemisphere, with a few southern hemisphere records as well. It grows, as the name suggests, on wet sites. Despite its common English name, this species is not a true elm, although it is a close relative of the elms (species of the genus Ulmus). It is also subject to Dutch elm disease, a disease which affects only members of the Ulmaceae. It is native to most of the southeast United States. It is hardy down to Zone 7.

Species
Planera aquatica

Fossil species

†Planera antiqua  (Santonian-Campanian; Paatuut Formation, Greenland) 
†Planera aquaticiformis  (Paleocene/Eocene; "Berg Lake flora", Alaska)
†Planera australis  (Late Cretaceous; Otago, New Zealand)
†Planera chankaensis  (Miocene; Novokachalinsk, Russia)
†Planera crenata  (jr homonym, replacement name P. lingualis)
†Planera cretacea  (Cretaceous; North Carolina)
†Planera dubia  (Eocene, Chuckanut Formation, Washington)
†Planera emarginata  (Tortonian, Poland)
†Planera ezoana  (Eocene; Hokkaido, Japan)
†Planera hebridica  ("Cenozoic"; Isle of Mull, Scotland)
†Planera knowltoniana  (Cenomanian; Raritan Formation, Virginia)
†Planera mullensis  ("Cenozoic"; Isle of Mull, Scotland)
†Planera myricifolia  (Priabonian; Florissant Formation, Colorado)
†Planera parvula  (Oligocene; France)
†Planera subkeaki  (Tortonian; La Cerdagnya, France)
†Planera thompsoniana  (Burdigalian; Brandon lignite, Vermont)
†Planera ulmifolia  (Paleocene; Brøgger peninsula, Spitsbergen) 
†Planera variabilis  (Ypresian; Green River Formation, Wyoming)

Species formerly included in Planera
†Abelicea ungeri 
†Cedrelospermum nervosum 
†Chaetoptelea microphylla 
†Fagopsis longifolia

References

Ulmaceae